"King Without a Crown" is a song by then Hasidic reggae singer Matisyahu. The song was originally from his 2004 debut studio album Shake off the Dust... Arise and then a shorter edited version was released as an official single in late 2005 in support of his second studio album, Youth. 

A live version of the song also appeared on his album Live at Stubb's (in Austin, Texas). The live version from Austin is the radio version.  On some limited editions of Youth and on the "King Without a Crown" three-track EP, there is a bonus track of "King Without a Crown" remixed by Mike D of the Beastie Boys. Along with the song "Youth", "King Without a Crown" is different from other songs on the album Youth, in that it has a lengthy guitar solo more in the spirit of rock than of reggae. "King Without a Crown" was also played in the movie Knocked Up.

The song hit No. 28 on the Billboard Hot 100 and No. 7 on the Modern Rock Tracks chart, making it Matisyahu's biggest hit of his career.

Charts

Weekly charts

Year-end charts

References

2005 debut singles
Matisyahu songs
2004 songs